Julián Domínguez (born 4 October 1996) is a professional Argentine rugby union player who plays as a winger for the Chicago Hounds of Major League Rugby (MLR) in the United States. He previously played for the Austin Gilgronis and New Orleans Gold.

He previously played for the Jaguares XV in the Currie Cup, internationally for Argentina XV and for the Argentina Sevens team.

References

1996 births
Living people
Argentine rugby union players
Jaguares (Super Rugby) players
Rugby union wings
Rugby union fullbacks
New Orleans Gold players
Austin Gilgronis players
Rugby union players from Buenos Aires
Chicago Hounds (rugby union) players